Sir Eric Errington, 1st Baronet (17 March 1900 – 3 June 1973) was a British barrister and Conservative Party politician. He was a Member of Parliament (MP) from 1935 to 1945, and from 1954 to 1970.

Early life

Sir Eric Errington was born on 17 March 1900 in Glasgow, Scotland, and was educated at Mill Hill School, Liverpool College and Trinity College, Oxford University. During the First World War he served in the Gordon Highlanders in 1918. He was called to the Bar by the Inner Temple in 1923.

Politics

In the 1929 general election, Errington was an unsuccessful candidate in Hanley for the Conservative Party. He fought Liverpool Scotland in the 1931 general election, becoming one of the few Conservative candidates to be defeated in the election. He was elected to Liverpool City Council for the Aigburth ward in 1934.

Having served his 'apprenticeship' in unfavourable seats, Errington had an opportunity in a winnable seat in the 1935 general election. He managed to win Bootle, and sat in Parliament for ten years. During the Second World War he enlisted in the Royal Air Force and served from 1939 to 1945. In the Labour landslide 1945 general election, however, Errington lost his seat.

Out of Parliament Errington remained involved in Conservative politics and was made Chairman of the North Western Area of the National Union in 1946 (a position he held until 1951). In 1948 he became a Justice of the Peace in Liverpool, an appointment facilitated by political party membership. In 1952 he became Chairman of the Executive Committee of the National Union of Conservative and Unionist Associations. He was knighted in the 1952 Queen's Birthday Honours List.

Abandoning Liverpool, Errington became MP for Aldershot in Hampshire in an October 1954 byelection. He held the safe seat until he retired in 1970. He was involved in business and was President of the National Federation of Property Owners from 1956 to 1959, and of the Hire Purchase Trade Association in 1965. From 1961, Errington's seniority in Parliament brought him the Chairmanship of the Estimates Sub-Committee on Home Affairs. He was also President of the Wessex Provincial Area of the National Union from 1962 to 1965. In 1963 he was made a baronet. He died on Anglesey aged 73.

Personal life
Sir Eric Errington married Marjorie Bennett, the daughter of Aida Grant Bennett, on 12 September 1924. They had three children together with the eldest, Geoffrey Fredrick Errington inheriting the Baronetcy in 1973 after his death. The Dowager, Lady Errington passed away five months and twenty days after the death of her husband Sir Eric Errington Bt.

References

 Who's Who of British MPs, vol. 4, Harvester Press, 1981.

External links 
 

1900 births
1973 deaths
Gordon Highlanders officers
Councillors in Liverpool
Politicians from Glasgow
Members of the Parliament of the United Kingdom for Liverpool constituencies
Conservative Party (UK) MPs for English constituencies
UK MPs 1935–1945
UK MPs 1951–1955
UK MPs 1955–1959
UK MPs 1959–1964
UK MPs 1964–1966
UK MPs 1966–1970
People educated at Mill Hill School
British Army personnel of World War I
Baronets in the Baronetage of the United Kingdom
Knights Bachelor
English justices of the peace
People educated at Liverpool College